is a subprefecture of Hokkaido Prefecture, Japan. Japan claims the southern parts of the disputed
Kuril Islands (known as the Northern Territories in Japan) as part of this subprefecture.

As of March 2009, the subprefecture has an estimated population of 84,035, and an area of 3406.23 km².

Nakashibetsu Airport, the easternmost airport in Japan, is located in the town of Nakashibetsu, Shibetsu District.

History 
November 1897: Nemuro Subprefecture established.
November 1897: Shana Subprefecture established.
December 1903: Shana Subprefecture and Nemuro Subprefecture merged.
August 1945: Soviets occupied the Kuril Islands.

Geography

Municipalities

Districts in the Northern Territories

Also known as the Southern Kuril Islands (administered by Russia, claimed by Japan; see Kuril Islands dispute):

Districts renounced in San Francisco Treaty

Uruppu (Urup)
Shimushiru (Simushir)
Shumushu (Shumshu)

Islands
 Habomai Rocks
 Shikotan Island
 Kunashiri
 Etorofu (Iturup)

Mergers

External links
Official Website 

Southern Kuriles
Subprefectures in Hokkaido